Leon Pugach (born 11 April 1972) is an Israeli male badminton player.

Achievements

BWF International Challenge/Series
Men's Doubles

 BWF International Challenge tournament
 BWF International Series tournament
 BWF Future Series tournament

References

External links
 

1972 births
Living people
Israeli male badminton players